is a Japanese former swimmer. He competed in the men's 1500 metre freestyle at the 1960 Summer Olympics.

References

External links
 

1941 births
Living people
Olympic swimmers of Japan
Swimmers at the 1960 Summer Olympics
People from Wakayama (city)
Asian Games medalists in swimming
Asian Games bronze medalists for Japan
Swimmers at the 1962 Asian Games
Medalists at the 1962 Asian Games
Japanese male freestyle swimmers
20th-century Japanese people